7 Cephei is a single star located approximately 820 light years away, in the northern circumpolar constellation of Cepheus. It is visible to the naked eye as a dim, blue-white hued star with an apparent visual magnitude of 5.42.

This object has 4.5 times the mass of the Sun and about three times the Sun's radius. It is spinning rapidly with a projected rotational velocity of 236 km/s. 7 Cephei is radiating 769 times the luminosity of the Sun from its photosphere at an effective temperature of 12,560 K.

References

B-type main-sequence stars
Cepheus (constellation)
Durchmusterung objects
Cephei, 07
204770
105972
8227